Tang, known in historiography as the Later Tang, was a short-lived imperial dynasty of China and the second of the Five Dynasties during the Five Dynasties and Ten Kingdoms period in Chinese history.

The first three of the Later Tang's four emperors were ethnically Shatuo. The name Tang was used to legitimize itself as the restorer of the Tang dynasty. Although the Later Tang officially began in 923, the dynasty already existed in the years before, as a polity known in historiography as the Former Jin (907–923).

At its height, Later Tang controlled most of northern China.

Rulers

Later Tang rulers family tree

References

Citations

Sources 

 

 
Five Dynasties and Ten Kingdoms
Dynasties in Chinese history
Former countries in Chinese history
923 establishments
10th-century establishments in China
936 disestablishments
10th-century disestablishments in China
States and territories established in the 920s
States and territories disestablished in the 930s